Panthrandu is a 2022 Indian Malayalam-language action drama film written and directed by Leo Thaddeus. The film stars Vinayakan, Dev Mohan, Shine Tom Chacko and Lal in important roles.

Cast 
The cast includes:
Dev Mohan as Emmanuel, an oud player
Vinayakan as Anthro
Shine Tom Chacko as Pathro, Anthro's younger brother
Lal as Peelu 
Srinda as Sicily, Pathro's wife
Sreelatha Namboothiri as Rossy, Sicily's mother
Veena Nair as Elsie, Anthro's sister
Prashanth Murali as Jude
James Eliya as Srank Paily
Sundara Pandyan as Yacob, Elsie's husband
Sohan Seenulal as Zacchaeus
Vijayakumar as S.I. Vattaoli
Vettukili Prakash as Lazar
Jayakrishnan as Kora
Swetha Vinod as Mariya
Oorali Martin as John

Production 
The film began production in 2021. During the press conference of the film when Vinayakan was asked about his #MeToo allegations, he said that he has never harmed any woman.

Soundtrack
The soundtrack features three songs composed by Alphons Joseph . The lyrics were written by  Joe Paul , Hari Narayanan  and San Jaimt.

 Track list

Release and reception 
The film released on 24 June 2022.

V. Vinod Nair of The Times of India wrote that "The film with its themes of friendship, family and love between brothers, amid the action thriller feel, makes it an entertainer for the family audience, as well". Sarin S. Rajan of Malayala Manorama called the film's flow slow but praised the visuals and strong screenplay.

References

External links 
 

2020s Malayalam-language films
2022 action drama films
2022 films
Indian action drama films
Films shot in Alappuzha
Films scored by Alphons Joseph
Films based on the Bible